Neunkirchen may refer to the following places:

In Austria
Neunkirchen, Austria, the capital of the district Neunkirchen in Lower Austria
Neunkirchen District, Austria

In Germany

Baden-Württemberg
Neunkirchen, Baden-Württemberg, in Neckar-Odenwald district

Bavaria
Neunkirchen am Brand, in Forchheim district
Neunkirchen am Sand, in Nürnberger Land district
Neunkirchen, Lower Franconia, in Miltenberg district
A part of Weiden in der Oberpfalz

Hesse
a district of the municipality Modautal in Hesse, see Modautal#Neunkirchen

North Rhine-Westphalia
Neunkirchen (Siegerland), a locality in Siegen-Wittgenstein district
Neunkirchen-Seelscheid, in Rhein-Sieg district

Rhineland-Palatinate
Neunkirchen, Bernkastel-Wittlich, part of the Verbandsgemeinde Thalfang am Erbeskopf in Bernkastel-Wittlich district
Neunkirchen am Potzberg, part of the Verbandsgemeinde Altenglan in Kusel district
Neunkirchen, Westerwaldkreis, part of the Verbandsgemeinde Rennerod in Westerwaldkreis

Saarland
Neunkirchen, Saarland, capital of the district of Neunkirchen
Neunkirchen (German district)

In France
Neunkirchen-lès-Bouzonville, municipality in the Moselle department

See also
Neukirchen (disambiguation)
Neuenkirchen (disambiguation)
Neukirch (disambiguation)
Neunkirch